Laufer is a surname. Notable people with the surname include:

 Alexander Laufer, Israeli writer and management consultant
 Amy Laufer, American politician in Virginia
 Berthold Laufer (1874–1934), American anthropologist
 Carlos Laufer, Brazilian musician and songwriter
 Franz-Josef Laufer (born 1952), German footballer
 Henry Laufer, American mathematician
 Johann Lauffer (1752–1833), Swiss-born Curaçaoan governor and businessman
 Peter Laufer, American journalist
 Pierre Lauffer (1920–1981), Curaçaoan poet and writer
 Tiffany Laufer, American film director
 Walter Laufer (1906–1984), American swimmer

See also

 Laufer (band), a rock band from Croatia

German-language surnames